Csaba Nagy (born 1970) is a Hungarian architect and politician, member of the National Assembly (MP) for Pécs (Baranya County Constituency II) from 2010 to 2014, and for Szigetvár (Baranya County Constituency IV) since 2018.

He served as deputy mayor of Pécs from June 4, 2009 to October 3, 2014. Nagy was a member of the Committee on Local Government and Regional Development from May 14, 2010 to May 5, 2014 and also of the Committee on Culture and the Press from September 23, 2013 to May 5, 2014. He was appointed President of the General Assembly of Baranya County in 2014, replacing Zsolt Tiffán.

Nagy returned to the National Assembly after the 2018 parliamentary election, obtaining a mandate in Szigetvár constituency and replacing fellow Fidesz member Zsolt Tiffán. He became a member of the Committee on Culture (May–October 2018) then of the Legislative Committee (since October 2018).

Personal life
He is married and has two children.

References

1970 births
Living people
Hungarian architects
Fidesz politicians
Members of the National Assembly of Hungary (2010–2014)
Members of the National Assembly of Hungary (2018–2022)
Members of the National Assembly of Hungary (2022–2026)
People from Pécs